Vida Jerman (28 May 1939 – 10 December 2011) was a Croatian theatre, film and television actress. She was also prominent in theatre for Esperanto-speaking community around the world.

She died on 10 December 2011 in Zagreb, after lung cancer.

Filmography

References

External links

1939 births
2011 deaths
Croatian film actresses
Croatian stage actresses
Croatian television actresses
Actresses from Zagreb
Deaths from lung cancer in Croatia
20th-century Croatian actresses
21st-century Croatian actresses

Villa Maria